Garra lancrenonensis is a species of ray-finned fish in the genus Garra known only from the Logone River system in Chad and Cameroon.

References

Garra
Fish described in 1960